"Mountain of Madness" (originally titled "The Most Excellent Snowy Mountain Adventure") is the twelfth episode of the eighth season of the American animated television series The Simpsons. It originally aired on the Fox network in the United States on February 2, 1997. In the episode, Mr. Burns forces the workers of the Springfield Nuclear Power Plant to go for a team-building hike in the mountains. Burns and Homer are paired together and trapped in a cabin that gets buried by several avalanches.

"Mountain of Madness" was directed by Mark Kirkland and written by John Swartzwelder. Swartzwelder's script underwent many rewrites, during which the story was completely rewritten from scratch. Several new designs and backgrounds had to be created for the wilderness scenes. The episode received mostly positive reviews.

Plot
During a fire drill at the Springfield Nuclear Power Plant, the employees panic and fail to evacuate the plant within 15 minutes. Outraged, Mr. Burns announces his workers must compete in a team-building exercise at a snow-covered mountain retreat. Due to a misunderstanding, Homer brings his family along by mistake for a vacation. The employees must work in pairs: Homer is partnered with Burns, while Smithers competes alone due to an odd number of participants (having originally thought the drawing was rigged so that he and Burns would be team-mates). The goal is to reach a cabin at the mountaintop, which contains food and alcohol; the last team to arrive will be fired.

Burns persuades Homer to cheat by using a snowmobile to reach the cabin. Arriving early, they enjoy the comfortable surroundings and each other's company. They clink their champagne glasses and inadvertently cause an avalanche that buries the entire cabin. They make several attempts to escape, but only cause more avalanches. Homer and Burns start blaming each other for causing the avalanches. They realize it may take days to be rescued and pass the time by playing games and building snowmen dressed in their clothes. Meanwhile, Bart and Lisa attempt to help Smithers get to the cabin, but inadvertently waste time looking for food and searching for gold, much to Smithers' dismay. Lenny and Carl arrive at the right spot but find the cabin gone and unaware it is buried beneath them, so they leave. The other employees reach a ranger station, thinking it is their destination. When the workers realize that Homer and Burns have yet to arrive, they suspect something bad has happened to them. After a few hours in the cabin, Homer and Burns are beset by cabin fever and have paranoid thoughts. After a vicious struggle, Burns accidentally ignites the propane tank, launching the building from the snow and propelling it toward the workers, who are preparing a rescue operation.

When the fuel is spent, the cabin comes to a halt just inches from hitting the ranger station, and Burns and Homer emerge cold and disheveled. Burns reminds everyone of the contest, so the workers rush inside. Lenny is fired after being the last person in the cabin. After, Burns realizes his workers have learned the value of teamwork and announces that no one will be fired after all. Lenny prepares to harangue Burns for firing him, but falls in a pit of snow. The workers and Homer's family celebrate their shared victory while Homer and Burns eye each other suspiciously.

Production

The script for "Mountain of Madness" is credited to John Swartzwelder, although it underwent many rewrites. According to Josh Weinstein, "a Swartzwelder script is like a finely tooled crazy German machine and if you have the wrong engineers try to fix it, it blows up. And that's the thing, 'cause it had great jokes but we sort of changed the story and went through a bunch of drafts." The story was completely rewritten and as a result, the plot became odder and quirkier with the scenes of paranoia deriving from this. The original script was "really crazy" but a lot of the more insane material was cut. However, most of the rewrites were done during the script-writing and did not require any major animation changes. One change was the ending, which was added after the animatic. The episode features several pairings of established characters who had previously interacted little, such as Waylon Smithers with Bart and Lisa. Weinstein feels that this was one of the first episodes to notably develop Lenny and Carl as a duo.

The episode was directed by Mark Kirkland and a lot of new designs and backgrounds had to be created for the wilderness scenes. The backgrounds were designed by animator Debbie Silver. The design of the forest ranger was based on then-Vice President Al Gore. In the episode, Marge watches an old film which includes a comment from naturalist John Muir. The impression of Muir was done by Dan Castellaneta, who originally based the voice on an impersonator he met at Yosemite National Park. However, the producers asked him to make the voice older and crazier.

The episode makes references to the Ritz Brothers, Bobbsey twins, John Muir and Bazooka Joe.

Proposed ideas for the episode 
The episode was going to have Principal Skinner, Bart, and Lisa as the main characters trapped in the cabin, Edna Krabappel was going to be the one who competes alone due to an odd number of participants, and Homer as the one helping Edna get to the cabin. However, Mr. Burns takes over Skinner's role, Homer takes over Bart and Lisa's role, Smithers takes over Edna's role, Bart and Lisa take over Homer's role, and Marge has the same role. This idea would later turn into the season 12 episode "Skinner's Sense of Snow".

The episode was originally going to begin in medias res on a giant snow-covered mountain where the workers find Mr. Burns and Homer, heard them calling for help, and discover that they are trapped under the snow. Smithers then tells the viewer, "Oh, hi! I know what you're thinking. You were wondering how Simpson and Mr. Burns got into this mess. I can tell you, but it'll have to be quick before those two are frozen to death." and quickly goes back to the beginning of the story. The whole episode is used as a flashback narrated by Smithers until he says, "And that is how Simpson and Mr. Burns both got stuck in the snow. I sure hope that they are okay!" After that, Burns gives up and accidentally ignites the cabin's propane tank. But those scenes and Smithers' narration are deleted from the final cut.

Reception
In its original broadcast, "Mountain of Madness" finished 26th in ratings for the week of January 27-February 2, 1997, with a Nielsen rating of 10.5, equivalent to approximately 10.2 million viewing households. It was the fourth-highest-rated show on the Fox network that week, following The X-Files, World's Scariest Police Chases, and King of the Hill. Since airing, the episode has received mostly positive reviews from television critics. The authors of the book I Can't Believe It's a Bigger and Better Updated Unofficial Simpsons Guide, Warren Martyn and Adrian Wood, called it "an inventive episode, with several memorable moments". Tim Raynor of DVDTown.com said there are some "good, sidesplitting moments to say the least for this witty episode". DVD Movie Guide's Colin Jacobson called the episode "a good show" and praised it for the "snowy setting [that] allows the other characters to expand as well".

References

External links

1997 American television episodes
Television shows written by John Swartzwelder
The Simpsons (season 8) episodes